Gagea kunawurensis is an Asian  species of plants in the lily family. It is native to Central Asia, Xinjiang, Afghanistan, Iran, Pakistan, Western Himalayas, and South Caucasus.

Gagea kunawurensis is a bulb-forming perennial up to 15 cm tall. Its leaves are very narrow and thread-like, up to 15 cm long. The flowers are white or very pale yellow.

References

kunawurensis
Flora of Asia
Plants described in 1839